Suluspira is a genus of sea snails, marine gastropod mollusks, in the family Costellariidae, the ribbed miters.

Species
Species within the genus Suluspira include:
 Suluspira rosenbergi (Poppe, Guillot de Suduiraut & Tagaro, 2006)

References

Costellariidae
Monotypic gastropod genera